The UAE Football League (UFL) Player of the Year is awarded by the Sheikh Majid Bin Mohammed Football Season Award.

Best Emarati Player

Best Foreign Player

Wins By Club

References

MVP
Emirati football trophies and awards
Most valuable player awards
Awards established in 2008